The 1995 USC Trojans football team represented the University of Southern California (USC) in the 1995 NCAA Division I-A football season. In their tenth year under head coach John Robinson, the Trojans compiled a 9–2–1 record (6–1–1 against conference opponents), shared the Pacific-10 Conference (Pac-10) championship with Washington, and outscored their opponents by a combined total of 355 to 212.

Quarterback Brad Otton led the team in passing, completing 159 of 256 passes for 1,923 yards with 14 touchdowns and four interceptions.  Delon Washington led the team in rushing with 236 carries for 1,109 yards and six touchdowns. Keyshawn Johnson led the team in receiving with 102 catches for 1,434 yards and seven touchdowns.

Schedule

Roster

Game summaries

Notre Dame

Rose Bowl

1995 Trojans in professional football
The following players were claimed in the 1996 NFL Draft.

Other NFL players (from different drafts and free agent pickups):
John Allred
Rashard Cook
Brian Kelly
Matt Keneley
Daylon McCutcheon
Billy Miller
Chris Miller
Larry Parker
Darrell Russell

References

USC
USC Trojans football seasons
Pac-12 Conference football champion seasons
Rose Bowl champion seasons
USC Trojans football